Antaeotricha copromima is a moth in the family Depressariidae. It was described by Edward Meyrick in 1930. It is found in French Guiana and Brazil.

References

Moths described in 1930
copromima
Taxa named by Edward Meyrick
Moths of South America